Carswell is a Canadian information source servicing legal, tax, accounting, and human resource professionals. Founded in 1864,  it is a part of the professional division of Thomson Reuters.

Modern day
Carswell offers products, services, customized training, and technical support to practitioners and organizations across Canada and beyond. With headquartered in Toronto, Ontario, Carswell provides products and services in a range of formats, including books, looseleaf services, journals, newsletters, CD-ROMs, and online products.
Les Éditions Yvon Blais, a specialized legal publisher in the Quebec market, has been part of Carswell since 1996. Lexpert, Canada's leading source of news and information about the business of law, was acquired in 2004 then subsequently sold in 2019 to HAB Press, a division of Key Media. The Cyberbahn Group, a leading provider of corporate and commercial searches, company registrations, and litigation services in Canada, joined Carswell in 2008 and was later sold to Dye & Durham in 2019. Canada Law Book joined Carswell in 2010.

Carswell was named one of Canada's 50 Best Employers by The Globe and Mail Report on Business magazine in 2004, 2005, and 2006. Maclean's Magazine named Carswell one of Canada's Top 100 Employers and one of Greater Toronto's Top Employers.

References

External links
 Carswell.com Official site
 Academic Faculty book adoption site
 WestlawCanada.com Official site
 eReference Library printed works available in online format site
 TaxnetPro online research services site
 Carswell Legal Solutions Corporate and Litigation Solutions

Thomson Reuters
Legal research
Legal literature
Law firms established in 1864